Dragiša Kašiković (9 August 1932 – 19 June 1977) was a Bosnian writer who came to international renown after he and his nine-year-old stepdaughter were murdered by the State Security Administration (UDBA) of the Socialist Federal Republic of Yugoslavia.

Biography
Kašiković was born on 9 August 1932, in Hadžići near Sarajevo in an upper-middle class Bosnian Serb family originally from Trebinje, East Herzegovina. His father's name was Branko and his mother's Nevenka (née Rakić). Dragiša's grandfather was Nikola Kašiković, the editor of Bosanska vila which was one of the most well-known Serbian newspapers of that time.

After graduating high school, Kašiković enrolled in the University of Belgrade's Faculty of Law but was expelled due to his anti-communist and anti-regime beliefs. He managed to continue his studies in Ljubljana afterwards. In the meantime he wrote books for children and published his first two books.

As a law school student in 1952, the District Court of Dubrovnik sentenced Kašiković to eight months of strict jail for attempting to illegally leave the country.

Kašiković managed to cross the Yugoslav border in 1955 and move to Austria where he lived for two years. After struggling to survive, he moved to the United States with seven dollars in his pocket where he would continue his pro-monarchist activism.

Upon arriving in Chicago, he became the editor-in-chief of the emigrant newspaper Sloboda which was the official newspaper of the Serbian National Defense Council. Upon becoming editor, the newspaper was about to go defunct but Kašiković managed to renew interest in it. In 1963, Kašiković initiated the literary newspaper Danas and the satirical newspaper Čičak and began leading the Serbian National Defense Council's radio program. He also began translating works from the English language for the Serbian Orthodox Church in the United States. Kašiković graduated from university in the United States and was fluent in English, German and French along with his native Serbian.

Death
In the early morning hours of 19 June 1977, Kašiković and his nine-year-old stepdaughter Ivanka Milosevich were brutally murdered in the headquarters of the Sloboda newspaper by agents of the UDBA. Kašiković, sitting at his typewriter, was stabbed with a sharp knife 64 times. Hearing the commotion, his stepdaughter ran out and was stabbed 54 times. The murder case remains unsolved.

He is interred in the cemetery of the Saint Sava Serbian Orthodox Monastery in Libertyville, Illinois.

See also
List of unsolved murders

Notable books
 Genocid u Hrvatskoj 1941–1945
 Spomenica Draži
 Poručnik Kavaja
 Dupljaci
 Partija te tuži, Partija ti sudi

References

External links
 

1932 births
1977 deaths
1977 murders in the United States
20th-century journalists
20th-century translators
20th-century Bosnia and Herzegovina writers
Journalists from Sarajevo
Serbs of Bosnia and Herzegovina
Magazine publishers (people)
Members of the Serbian Orthodox Church
Serbian monarchists
Serbian nationalists
Serbian anti-communists
Serbian satirists
English–Serbian translators
Aphorists
University of Belgrade Faculty of Law alumni
Prisoners and detainees of Yugoslavia
Assassinated Yugoslav people
Assassinated Serbian journalists
Assassinated dissidents
Serbian people murdered abroad
Deaths by stabbing in Illinois
People murdered in Illinois
Male murder victims
Unsolved murders in the United States
Yugoslav emigrants to Austria
Yugoslav emigrants to the United States
Yugoslav dissidents
Burials at the Saint Sava Serbian Orthodox Monastery in Libertyville, Illinois